The Kalamazoo and South Haven Railroad is a defunct railroad which operated in southern Michigan during the late 19th and early 20th centuries.

The company incorporated on April 2, 1869 with the intention of constructing a  line from Kalamazoo to South Haven, on the shores of Lake Michigan. It was leased in 1870 to the Michigan Central Railroad and merged with the same in 1916.  The former rail bed has been transformed into the Kal-Haven Trail.

The railroad went through the following towns, starting from the east:

Kalamazoo, Michigan
Alamo, Michigan
Williams, Michigan
Mentha, Michigan
Kendall, Michigan
Pine Grove Mills, Michigan
Gobles, Michigan
Bloomingdale, Michigan
Berlamont, Michigan
Grand Junction, Michigan
Lacota, Michigan
Kibbe, Michigan
South Haven, Michigan

References

External links
Kal-Haven Trail State Park
Van Buren County Road Commission - Kal-Haven Trail page
Ghost town of Williams in Alamo Twp, Mich.

Companies affiliated with the Michigan Central Railroad
Predecessors of the New York Central Railroad
Companies based in Kalamazoo, Michigan
Transportation in Kalamazoo County, Michigan
Defunct Michigan railroads
West Michigan
Railway companies established in 1869
Railway companies disestablished in 1916
1869 establishments in Michigan